Baeckea is a genus of flowering plants in the myrtle family, Myrtaceae, all but one endemic to Australia. Plants in the genus Baeckea are shrubs or small trees with leaves arranged in opposite pairs, white to deep pink flowers with five sepals and five petals, and five to fifteen stamens that are shorter than the petals.

Description
Plants in the genus Baeckea are glabrous shrubs, sometimes small trees, usually with the leaves arranged in opposite pairs or decussate. The flowers are usually arranged singly in leaf axils on a pedicel with two bracteoles at the base but that sometimes fall off as the flower opens. There are five sepals and five white to deep pink , more or less round petals that are free from each other. Five to fifteen stamens are arranged in a single row and are shorter that the petals and open by parallel slits. The fruit is a capsule containing many seeds.

Taxonomy
The genus Baeckea was first formally described in 1753 by Carl Linnaeus in his Species Plantarum. The genus is named in honor of the Swedish physician Abraham Bäck (or Baeck) (1713–1795).

Many species formerly placed in the genus are currently included in  Euryomyrtus, Harmogia, Kardomia, Oxymyrrhine,  Rinzia, Sannantha, Seorsus and Triplarina.

The closest genera to Baeckea are the fleshy-fruited Myrcianthes and Acmena, and the dry-fruited Angophora and Backhousia.

Distribution and habitat
Species in the genus Baeckea are endemic to Australia, apart from B. frutescens that also occurs in Malesia.

Species list
The names of 27 species of Baeckea have been accepted by Plants of the World Online as at January 2022:
Baeckea brevifolia (Rudge) DC. (N.S.W.)
Baeckea diosmifolia Rudge – fringed baeckea (Qld., N.S.W.)
Baeckea elderiana Pritz. (W.A.)
Baeckea exserta S.Moore (W.A.)
Baeckea frutescens L. (S.E. Asia, New Guinea, Qld., N.S.W.)
Baeckea grandibracteata Pritz. (W.A.)
Baeckea grandiflora Benth. – large-flowered baeckea (W.A.)
Baeckea grandis Pritz. (W.A.)
Baeckea gunniana S.Schauer ex Walp. – alpine baeckea (N.S.W., Vic., Tas.)
Baeckea imbricata (Gaertn.) Druce – heath myrtle (Qld., N.S.W.)
Baeckea kandos A.R.Bean (N.S.W.)
Baeckea latens C.R.P.Andrews (W.A.)
Baeckea latifolia (Benth.) A.R.Bean (N.S.W., Vic.)
Baeckea leptocaulis Hook.f. (Tas.)
Baeckea leptophylla (Turcz.) Domin (W.A.)
Baeckea linifolia Rudge – swamp baeckea, weeping baeckea, flax-leaf heath myrtle (Qld., N.S.W., Vic.)
Baeckea muricata C.A.Gardner (W.A.)
Baeckea omissa A.R.Bean (Qld., N.S.W.)
Baeckea pachyphylla Benth. (W.A.)
Baeckea pentagonantha F.Muell. (W.A.)
Baeckea pygmaea Benth. (W.A.)
Baeckea robusta F.Muell. (W.A.)
Baeckea staminosa Pritz. (W.A.)
Baeckea subcuneata F.Muell. (W.A.)
Baeckea trapeza A.R.Bean (Qld.)
Baeckea uncinella Benth. (W.A.)
Baeckea utilis F.Muell. ex Miq. – mountain baeckea (N.S.W., A.C.T., Vic.)

References

 
Myrtaceae genera
Taxa named by Carl Linnaeus